"Out of Nowhere" is a song by Gloria Estefan. The single was the only commercial release of the compilation Greatest Hits Vol. II. The song is written by Emilio Estefan, Jr., Randall Barlow and Liza Quintana, and is produced by Estefan Jr. and Barlow. It was released as the album's second single on April 24, 2001 by Epic Records.

Song history 
This song was the first single released commercially for the compilation and was hit on the dance charts, becoming another top ten hit for Estefan at the Hot Dance Club Play, peaked at #6. The song was nominated for several dance awards including the Grammy Award for Best Dance Recording but lost to the Janet Jackson hit, "All for You". The song was also nominated for two International Latin Billboard Music Awards for Latin Dance Club Play Track of the Year and Latin Dance Maxi-Single of the Year.

Chart performance

References

2001 singles
Gloria Estefan songs
Songs written by Emilio Estefan
2001 songs
Dance-pop songs
House music songs
Epic Records singles